Croton nepetifolius (Croton nepetaefolius) is an aromatic species of flowering plant in the spurge family, Euphorbiaceae, that is native to northeastern Brazil. It is commonly known as marmeleiro vermelh (red quince). The plant has been used in folk medicine as a sedative, an orexigenic (appetite enhancer) and an antispasmodic (muscle contraction suppressor).

See also
 List of Croton species

References

monanthogynus
Plants described in 1864
Taxa named by Henri Ernest Baillon